All-Defensive Team may refer to:
NBA All-Defensive Team
 WNBA All-Defensive Team
 Philippine Basketball Association All-Defensive Team